Volzhsky District is the name of several administrative and municipal districts in Russia. The districts are generally named after the Volga River, a major river in Russia.

Districts of the federal subjects
Volzhsky District, Mari El Republic, an administrative and municipal district of the Mari El Republic
Volzhsky District, Samara Oblast, an administrative and municipal district of Samara Oblast

City divisions
Volzhsky City District, a city district of Saratov, the administrative center of Saratov Oblast

See also
Privolzhsky District
Volzhsky (disambiguation)

References